Lia Manoliu (25 April 1932 – 9 January 1998) was a Romanian discus thrower who won one gold and two bronze Olympic medals. She was the first track and field athlete to compete at six Olympics (1952–1972).

Early life; sports and education
As a teenager Manoliu competed at the national level in tennis, table tennis, volleyball and basketball, before turning to throwing events at the age of 16. Two years later she became the first Romanian woman to throw the disc over 40 m (41.44 m, 22 May 1950). In the mid-1950s she graduated from the Polytechnic Institute of Bucharest.

International career
At the 1952 Summer Olympics in Helsinki, Manoliu finished 6th with a throw of 42.64 m. She bettered this distance in 1956 in Melbourne, throwing 43.90 m for a ninth-place finish. At the 1960 Olympics in Rome, she held the lead after the first round with a throw of 52.36 m, and although she was unable to improve it, the throw was sufficient to earn her the bronze medal. At the 1964 Olympics in Tokyo, Manoliu was outside the podium after round four, but then she produced a throw of 56.96 m to gain her second Olympic bronze medal.

In the winter of 1967–68, the Romanian Athletics Federation informed the 35-year-old Manoliu that she was too old to try for the Olympics again and that she need not bother turning out for their training camp sessions. This only increased her determination, and after months of individual training, she qualified for the Mexico City Olympics. There, she carried an arm injury, and the team doctor warned her that she would not last more than one good throw. Manoliu threw 58.28 m on her first attempt, which proved good enough for the gold medal.

On 19 July 1969, Manoliu won the UK national WAAA discus title at Crystal Palace, and in 1972, she finished 9th in the discus final at the 1972 Olympics with a throw of 58.50 m.

After retirement
She retired shortly after the 1972 Games, and in 1974 was awarded the UNESCO Fair Play Prize, for her support to the ideals of fair and loyal competition.

From 1973 and until her death Manoliu served as vice-president and then as president (since 1990) of the Romanian Olympic Committee. In 1975 she was awarded the Olympic Order in bronze and in 1994 the International Olympic Committee Centennial Trophy. She was a member of the IAAF Women's Committee (1976–1995) and of the Romanian Senate in the 1990–1992 legislature.

Death and legacy
She died of a heart attack in January 1998 after lapsing into a coma during surgery for a brain tumor the week before. She was buried at Bellu Cemetery. Until 2012 The national stadium in Bucharest was named after her.

See also
List of athletes with the most appearances at Olympic Games

Further reading

References

Romanian female discus throwers
Olympic athletes of Romania
Athletes (track and field) at the 1952 Summer Olympics
Athletes (track and field) at the 1956 Summer Olympics
Athletes (track and field) at the 1960 Summer Olympics
Athletes (track and field) at the 1964 Summer Olympics
Athletes (track and field) at the 1968 Summer Olympics
Athletes (track and field) at the 1972 Summer Olympics
Olympic gold medalists for Romania
Olympic bronze medalists for Romania
Burials at Bellu Cemetery
1932 births
1998 deaths
Members of the Senate of Romania
Sportspeople from Chișinău
Medalists at the 1968 Summer Olympics
Medalists at the 1964 Summer Olympics
Medalists at the 1960 Summer Olympics
Olympic gold medalists in athletics (track and field)
Olympic bronze medalists in athletics (track and field)
Presidents of the Romanian Olympic and Sports Committee